The 1983 college football season may refer to:

 1983 NCAA Division I-A football season
 1983 NCAA Division I-AA football season
 1983 NCAA Division II football season
 1983 NCAA Division III football season
 1983 NAIA Division I football season
 1983 NAIA Division II football season